Neil J. Calkin (born 29 March 1961) is a professor at Clemson University in the Algebra and Discrete Mathematics group of the School of Mathematical and Statistical Sciences.  His interests are in combinatorial and probabilistic methods, mainly as applied to number theory.

Together with Herbert Wilf he founded The Electronic Journal of Combinatorics in 1994. He and Wilf developed the Calkin–Wilf tree and the associated Calkin–Wilf sequence.

Biography
Neil Calkin was born 29 March 1961, in Hartford, Connecticut and moved to the UK around the age of 3.  He grew up there and studied mathematics at Trinity College Cambridge before moving to Canada in 1984 to study in the Department of Combinatorics and Optimization at the University of Waterloo where he was awarded a PhD (1988) for his thesis "Sum-Free Sets and Measure Spaces" written under the supervision of Ian Peter Goulden.

He was the Zeev Nehari Visiting Assistant Professor of Mathematics at Carnegie Mellon University (1988—1991), an assistant professor at Georgia Tech (1991—1997), and joined the Algebra and Discrete Mathematics group of the School of Mathematical and Statistical Sciences at Clemson University in 1997.

Calkin has an Erdös number of 1. He was one of the last people to collaborate with Erdős and once said of him, "One of my greatest regrets is that I didn't know him when he was a million times faster than most people. When I knew him he was only hundreds of times faster."

Selected papers

Books

References

External links
 Neil Calkin at the Mathematics Genealogy Project
 Neil J. Calkin's Publications

20th-century English mathematicians
21st-century English mathematicians
Alumni of Trinity College, Cambridge
University of Waterloo alumni
Clemson University faculty
Combinatorial game theorists
Recreational mathematicians
Mathematics popularizers
Combinatorialists
Probability theorists
Number theorists
1961 births
Living people